Haldun Taner (March 16, 1915 – May 7, 1986) was a well-known Turkish playwright and short story writer.

Biography
He was born on March 16, 1915, in Istanbul. After graduating from the Galatasaray High School in 1935, he studied politics and economy at the University of Heidelberg in Germany, until a serious health problem forced him to return to Turkey, where he graduated from the Faculty of German Literature and Linguistics in 1950. He also studied theatre and philosophy at the University of Vienna between 1955 and 1957 under the direction of Heinz Kindermann (1894–1985), an Austrian theater and literary scholar.

As a well-disciplined writer accumulating a rich blend of culture, Taner wrote a great number of stories, generally humorous; essays, newspaper columns, travel writings and theatre plays, in particular, brought him several important awards including the New York Herald Tribune Story Contest First Prize (1954), the Sait Faik Story Award (1954), the International Festival of the Humor of Bordighera Award (1969), and so on. Among his plays, the most popular is Keşanlı Ali Destanı (Epopee of Ali of Keshan). His stories have been translated into German, French, English, Russian, Greek, Slovenian, Swedish, and Hebrew.

In 1967, together with Metin Akpınar, Zeki Alasya and Ahmet Gülhan, he founded the Devekuşu Kabare (literally, the Ostrich Cabaret; see the Turkish Wikipedia entry Devekuşu Kabare). He educated and worked with many actors and directors. In addition, he has a distinguished place in Turkish literature due to his essays, and newspaper articles.

Haldun Taner died of a sudden heart attack on May 7, 1986, in Istanbul. He was laid to rest at the Küplüce Cemetery following the religious funeral service at the Teşvikiye Mosque on May 9.

Legacy

 A theatre venue in Kadıköy district of Istanbul is named in his honor.
 The International Organization of Turkic Culture declared the year 2015 as the Year of Haldun Taner and Semen Kadyshev.

Bibliography 

Theater
 Günün Adamı (1957)
 Dışardakiler (1957)
 Ve Değirmen Dönerdi (1958)
 Fazilet Eczanesi (1960)
 Timsah (1960)
 Lütfen Dokunmayın (1961)
 Huzur Çıkmazı (1962)
 Keşanlı Ali Destanı (1964)
 Gözlerimi Kaparım, Vazifemi Yaparım (1964)
 Eşeğin Gölgesi (1965)
 Zilli Zarife (1966)
 Vatan Kurtaran Şaban (1967)
 Bu Şehr-i İstanbul Ki (1968)
 Sersem Kocanın Kurnaz Karısı (1969)
 Astronot Niyazi (1970)
 Ha Bu Diyar (1971)
 Dün Bugün (1971)
 Aşk-u Sevda (1973)
 Dev Aynası (1973)
 Yâr Bana Bir Eğlence (1974)
 Ayışığında Şamata (1977)
 Hayırdır İnşallah (1980)
 Marko Paşa (1985)
 Aleyna'nın kızı (1985)

Stories
 Geçmiş Zaman Olur Ki (1946)
 Yaşasın Demokrasi (1948)
 Şişhane'ye Yağmur Yağıyordu (1950)
 Tuş (1951)
 Onikiye Bir Var (1953)
 Ayışığında Çalışkur (1954)
 Sancho’nun Sabah Yürüyüşü (1964)
 Konçinalar (1967)
 Kızıl Saçlı Amazon (1970)
 Yalıda Sabah (1979)
 Şeytan Tüyü (1980)
 Bir Kavak Ve İnsanlar
 Ayak

References

 Who is who database - Biography of Haldun Taner

External links
 

1915 births
1986 deaths
Galatasaray High School alumni
Heidelberg University alumni
Turkish dramatists and playwrights
Writers from Istanbul
University of Vienna alumni
Burials at Küplüce Cemetery
20th-century dramatists and playwrights
Turkish socialists